Mishino is the name of several rural localities in Russia.

Ivanovo Oblast
As of 2010, one rural locality in Ivanovo Oblast bears this name:
Mishino, Ivanovo Oblast, a village in Verkhnelandekhovsky District

Kirov Oblast
As of 2010, one rural locality in Kirov Oblast bears this name:
Mishino, Kirov Oblast, a village in Ichetovkinsky Rural Okrug of Afanasyevsky District

Leningrad Oblast
As of 2010, one rural locality in Leningrad Oblast bears this name:
Mishino, Leningrad Oblast, a village in Vistinskoye Settlement Municipal Formation of Kingiseppsky District

Lipetsk Oblast
As of 2010, one rural locality in Lipetsk Oblast bears this name:
Mishino, Lipetsk Oblast, a village in Lomigorsky Selsoviet of Volovsky District

Moscow Oblast
As of 2010, one rural locality in Moscow Oblast bears this name:
Mishino, Moscow Oblast, a village in Gololobovskoye Rural Settlement of Zaraysky District

Nizhny Novgorod Oblast
As of 2010, one rural locality in Nizhny Novgorod Oblast bears this name:
Mishino, Nizhny Novgorod Oblast, a village in Solomatovsky Selsoviet of Chkalovsky District

Novgorod Oblast
As of 2010, one rural locality in Novgorod Oblast bears this name:
Mishino, Novgorod Oblast, a village in Volokskoye Settlement of Borovichsky District

Penza Oblast
As of 2010, one rural locality in Penza Oblast bears this name:
Mishino, Penza Oblast, a selo in Kamenno-Brodsky Selsoviet of Issinsky District

Perm Krai
As of 2010, two rural localities in Perm Krai bear this name:
Mishino, Karagaysky District, Perm Krai, a village in Karagaysky District
Mishino, Vereshchaginsky District, Perm Krai, a village in Vereshchaginsky District

Pskov Oblast
As of 2010, two rural localities in Pskov Oblast bear this name:
Mishino, Dedovichsky District, Pskov Oblast, a village in Dedovichsky District
Mishino, Novorzhevsky District, Pskov Oblast, a village in Novorzhevsky District

Smolensk Oblast
As of 2010, four rural localities in Smolensk Oblast bear this name:
Mishino, Gagarinsky District, Smolensk Oblast, a village in Nikolskoye Rural Settlement of Gagarinsky District
Mishino, Otnosovskoye Rural Settlement, Vyazemsky District, Smolensk Oblast, a village in Otnosovskoye Rural Settlement of Vyazemsky District
Mishino, Polyanovskoye Rural Settlement, Vyazemsky District, Smolensk Oblast, a village in Polyanovskoye Rural Settlement of Vyazemsky District
Mishino, Yermolinskoye Rural Settlement, Vyazemsky District, Smolensk Oblast, a village in Yermolinskoye Rural Settlement of Vyazemsky District

Tver Oblast
As of 2010, three rural localities in Tver Oblast bear this name:
Mishino, Konakovsky District, Tver Oblast, a village in Konakovsky District
Mishino, Toropetsky District, Tver Oblast, a village in Toropetsky District
Mishino, Zubtsovsky District, Tver Oblast, a village in Zubtsovsky District

Vladimir Oblast
As of 2010, one rural locality in Vladimir Oblast bears this name:
Mishino, Vladimir Oblast, a village in Muromsky District

Vologda Oblast
As of 2010, five rural localities in Vologda Oblast bear this name:
Mishino, Sholsky Selsoviet, Belozersky District, Vologda Oblast, a village in Sholsky Selsoviet of Belozersky District
Mishino, Sholsky Selsoviet, Belozersky District, Vologda Oblast, a village in Sholsky Selsoviet of Belozersky District
Mishino, Chagodoshchensky District, Vologda Oblast, a village in Izboishchsky Selsoviet of Chagodoshchensky District
Mishino, Cherepovetsky District, Vologda Oblast, a village in Dmitriyevsky Selsoviet of Cherepovetsky District
Mishino, Vytegorsky District, Vologda Oblast, a village in Saminsky Selsoviet of Vytegorsky District

See also
Mishin